Prepops bivittis is a species of plant bug in the family Miridae. It is found in Central America and North America.

Subspecies
These two subspecies belong to the species Prepops bivittis:
 Prepops bivittis bivittis (Stål, 1862)
 Prepops bivittis evittatus (Knight, 1929)

References

Further reading

 

Articles created by Qbugbot
Insects described in 1862
Restheniini